Bettenham is a surname. Notable people with the surname include:

 William Bettenham (fl. 1386–1400), English politician
 Stephen Bettenham, lawyer and landowner

See also
 Bettenham Mill